J-Euro Non-Stop Best is a megamix compilation album, consisting of recordings by various Avex artists produced and/or remixed by various music producers mostly those of eurobeat from Italy, released in 2001 by Avex Trax.

As an album in the Super Eurobeat Presents : J-Euro series, J-Euro Non-Stop Best contained 30 tracks including ones sung by prominent Avex artists such as Ayumi Hamasaki, MAX and Every Little Thing.

J-Euro Non-Stop Best can be considered a greatest hits album, as the album consists of many smash hits in the 2000 "J-Euro" boom in the Para Para scene.



Tracks

Further details

J-Euro Non-Stop Best is an album in the Super Eurobeat Presents : J-Euro series launched in 2000, along with Ayu-ro Mix 1–2 featuring Ayumi Hamasaki, Euro Every Little Thing featuring Every Little Thing, Hyper Euro MAX featuring MAX, Euro Global featuring globe, Euro "Dream" Land featuring Dream, and J-Euro Best.

The non-stop mixing was done by two members of the team New Generation; Seiji Honma and Katsunari Mochizuki.

The album appeared on Oricon's weekly album chart four times and reached #29 in October 2001.

References

Super Eurobeat
2001 compilation albums
2001 remix albums